The 2003 Wealden District Council election took place on 1 May 2003 to elect members of Wealden District Council in East Sussex, England. The whole council was up for election with boundary changes since the last election in 1999 reducing the number of seats by 3. The Conservative Party stayed in overall control of the council.

Background
At the last election in 1999 the Conservatives won 34 seats, compared to 22 for the Liberal Democrats and 2 independents. In November 2003 the Conservatives gained 2 seats from the Liberal Democrats in a by-election in Uckfield, but the Liberal Democrats took one seat back in the same ward in a June 2002 by-election.

The Liberal Democrats also lost seats after 2 Hailsham councillors, Nick and Madeline Ellwood, were expelled from the party, and a further 2, John Glover and Ian Haffenden, resigned from the party in protest. The 4 councillors who resigned formed a Wealden Independents party, while the leader of the Liberal Democrat group on the council, Allan Thurley, stepped down over the expulsions and was succeeded by Eddie Rice.

A total of 133 candidates stood for the 55 seats in 35 wards being contested, after boundary changes reduced the number of seats from 58. The changes increased the number of seats in Crowborough and Uckfield, while combining some of the rural seats.

Campaign
A major issue at the election was council tax after it increased by 18%, 5.1% of which was due to Wealden Council. The Conservatives blamed the increase on the government providing a poor grant to the council, while the Liberal Democrats called for the council tax to be replaced by a local income tax. Another issue was housing with the Conservatives called for more land to be released for low cost housing, but the Liberal Democrats attacked the number of houses to be built, saying the infrastructure needed to be improved first. Both the Labour party and local independents also campaigned against the 1,300 houses to be built in Hailsham, with The Independents saying more houses should be built in the north of the council area.

The Conservatives said they would tackle littering and continue the household recycling scheme, while the Liberal Democrats called for policing to be improved and for the council to be modernised. Meanwhile, Labour aimed to win their first seat on the council in Uckfield and called for the council to abolish the reduction in council tax for second homes.

Election result
The Conservatives stayed in control of the council with 34 seats, while the Liberal Democrats took 15 seats and independents won 6. Few seats changed parties, with the Conservatives keeping a 13-seat majority. The changes that did happen included the Liberal Democrat group leader Eddie Rice losing his seat in Rotherfield and the Liberal Democrats were also defeated in Polegate South, where Ivy Scarborough, a Residents Association candidate was successful. Independents were also successful in Crowborough and Hailsham, while Labour failed to take any seats. Overall turnout at the election was 35%, up from 33.5% in 1999.

3 Conservative candidates were unopposed at the election.

Ward results

By-elections between 2003 and 2007

Uckfield Ridgewood
A by-election was held in Uckfield Ridgewood on 16 September 2004 and was held for the Liberal Democrats by Robert Sweetland with a 185-vote majority.

Pevensey and Westham
A by-election was held in Pevensey and Westham on 29 September 2005 after the death of the previous councillor John Vincent. The seat was held for the Conservatives by Kevin Balsdon with a 760-vote majority.

Crowborough North
A by-election was held in Crowoborough North on 6 April 2006 and was held for the Conservatives by Timothy Tyler with a 279-vote majority.

Uckfield New Town
A by-election was held in Uckfield New Town on 29 June 2006 after the death of the Liberal Democrat councillor Ian Nottage. The seat was held for the Liberal Democrats by Julia Hey with a 170-vote majority.

References

2003 English local elections
2003
2000s in East Sussex